A mobile operating system is an operating system for smartphones, tablets, smartwatches, smartglasses, or other non-laptop personal mobile computing devices. While computers such as typical laptops are "mobile", the operating systems used on them are generally not considered mobile ones, as they were originally designed for desktop computers that historically did not have or need specific mobile features. This line distinguishing mobile and other forms has   become blurred in recent years, due to the fact that newer devices have become smaller and more mobile unlike hardware of the past. Key notabilities blurring this line are the introduction of tablet computers and light-weight laptops and the hybridization of the two in 2-in-1 PCs.

Mobile operating systems combine features of a desktop computer operating system with other features useful for mobile or handheld use, and usually including a wireless inbuilt modem and SIM tray for telephony and data connection. In Q1 2018, over 123 million smartphones were sold (highest ever recorded) with 60.2 percent running Android and 20.9 percent running iOS. Nonetheless, although not as many as 2018 (1.56 billion), 2021 still had soaring sales, 1.43 billion to be exact with 53.32 percent being Android. Android alone is more popular than the popular desktop operating system Microsoft Windows, and in general smartphone use (even without tablets) outnumbers desktop use.

Mobile devices, with mobile communications abilities (e.g., smartphones), contain two mobile operating systemsthe main user-facing software platform is supplemented by a second low-level proprietary real-time operating system which operates the radio and other hardware. Research has shown that these low-level systems may contain a range of security vulnerabilities permitting malicious base stations to gain high levels of control over the mobile device.

Mobile operating systems have majority use since 2017 (measured by web use); with even only the smartphones running them (excluding tablets) having majority use, more used than any other kind of device. Thus traditional desktop OS is now a minority-used kind of OS; see usage share of operating systems. However, variations occur in popularity by regions, while desktop-minority also applies on some days in countries such as United States and United Kingdom. Android and iOS currently dominant 80% of the market share of mobile operating systems worldwide.

Timeline

Mobile operating system milestones mirror the development of mobile phones, PDAs, and smartphones:

Pre-1993
 1973–1993 – Mobile phones use embedded systems to control operation.

1993–1999
 1993
 April – PenPoint OS by GO Corp. becomes available on the AT&T EO Personal Communicator.
 August – Apple launches Newton OS running on their Newton series of portable computers.
 1994
 March – Magic Cap OS by General Magic is first introduced on the Sony Magic Link PDA.
 August – The first smartphone, the IBM Simon, has a touchscreen, email, and PDA features.
 1996
 March – The Palm Pilot 1000 personal digital assistant is introduced with the Palm OS mobile operating system.
 August – Nokia releases the Nokia 9000 Communicator running an integrated system based on the PEN/GEOS 3.0 OS from Geoworks.
 1997 – EPOC32 first appears on the Psion Series 5 PDA. Release 6 of EPOC32 will later be renamed to Symbian OS.
 1998 – Symbian Ltd. is formed as a joint venture by Psion, Ericsson, Motorola, and Nokia, Psion's EPOC32 OS becomes Symbian's EPOC operating system, and is later renamed to Symbian OS. Symbian's OS was used by those companies and several other major mobile phone brands, but especially Nokia.
 1999
 June – Qualcomm's pdQ becomes the first smartphone with Palm OS.
 October – Nokia S40 Platform is officially introduced along with the Nokia 7110, the first phone with T9 predictive text input and a Wireless Application Protocol (WAP) browser for accessing specially formatted Internet data.

2000s
 2000 – The Ericsson R380 is released with EPOC32 Release 5, marking the first use on a phone of what's to become known as Symbian OS (as of Release 6).
 2001
 June – Nokia's Symbian Series 80 platform is first released on the Nokia 9210 Communicator This is the first phone running an OS branded as Symbian, and the first phone using that OS that allows user installation of additional software.
 September – Qualcomm's Binary Runtime Environment for Wireless (BREW) platform on their REX real-time operating system (RTOS) is first released on the Kyocera QCP-3035.
 2002
 March
 BlackBerry releases its first smartphone, running Java 2 Micro Edition (J2ME).
 UIQ is first released, at v2.0, on Symbian OS, and becomes available later in the year on the Sony Ericsson P800, the successor to the Ericsson R380.
 June
 Microsoft's first Windows CE (Pocket PC) smartphones are introduced.
 Nokia's Symbian Series 60 (S60) platform is released with the Nokia 7650, Nokia's first phone with a camera and Multimedia Messaging Service (MMS). S60 would form the basis of the OS on most of Nokia's smartphones until 2011, when they adopted Microsoft's Windows Phone 7. S60 was also used on some phones from Samsung and others, and later by Sony Ericsson after the consolidation of some Symbian UI variants in 2008.
 October – The Danger Hiptop (T-Mobile Sidekick in U.S.) is first released by Danger, Inc., running DangerOS.
 2003 – Motorola introduces first Linux-based cellphone Motorola A760 base on Linux MontaVista distribution.
 2005
 May – Microsoft announces Windows Mobile 5.0.
 November – Nokia introduces Maemo OS on the first, small Internet tablet, the N770, with a 4.13" screen.
 2007
 January – Apple's iPhone with iOS (named "iPhone OS" for its first three releases) is introduced as a "widescreen iPod", "mobile phone", and "Internet communicator".
 February – Microsoft announces Windows Mobile 6.0.
 May – Palm announces the Palm Foleo, a "Mobile Companion" device similar to a subnotebook computer, running a modified Linux kernel and relying on a companion Palm Treo smartphone to send and retrieve mail, as well as provide data connectivity when away from WiFi. Palm canceled Foleo development on September 4, 2007, after facing public criticism.
 June - World's very first iPhone is released in the United States.
 November – Open Handset Alliance (OHA) is established, led by Google with 34 members (HTC, Sony, Dell, Intel, Motorola, Samsung, LG, etc.)
 2008
 February – LiMo Foundation announces the first phones running the LiMo mobile Linux distribution, from Motorola, NEC, Panasonic Mobile, and Samsung, released later in the year. The LiMo Foundation later became the Tizen Association and LiMo was subsumed by Tizen.
 June – Nokia becomes the sole owner of Symbian Ltd. The Symbian Foundation was then formed to co-ordinate the future development of the Symbian platform among the corporations using it, in a manner similar to the Open Handset Alliance with Android. Nokia remained the major contributor to Symbian's code.
 July – Apple releases iPhone OS 2 with the iPhone 3G, making available Apple's App Store.
 October – OHA releases Android (based on Linux kernel) 1.0 with the HTC Dream (T-Mobile G1) as the first Android phone.
 November – Symbian^1, the Symbian Foundation's touch-specific S60-based platform (equivalent to S60 5th edition) is first released on Nokia's first touchscreen Symbian phone, the Nokia 5800 XpressMusic, with a resistive screen and a stylus. Symbian^1 being derived from S60 meant that support for UIQ disappeared and no further devices using UIQ were released.
 2009
 January
 Intel announces Moblin 2, specifically created for netbooks that run the company's Atom processor. In April 2009 Intel turned Moblin over to the Linux Foundation.
 Palm introduces webOS with the Palm Pre (released in June). The new OS is not backward-compatible with their previous Palm OS.
 February
 Palm announces that no further devices with Palm OS are going to be released by the company. (The last was the Palm Centro, released October 14, 2007.)
 Microsoft announces Windows Mobile 6.5, an "unwanted stopgap" update to Windows Mobile 6.1 intended to bridge the gap between version 6.1 and the then yet-to-be released Windows Mobile 7 (later canceled in favor of Windows Phone 7). The first devices running it appeared in late October 2009.
 May – DangerOS 5.0 becomes available, based on NetBSD.
 June – Apple releases iPhone OS 3 with the iPhone 3GS.
 November – Nokia releases the Nokia N900, its first and only smartphone running the Maemo OS intended for "handheld computers...with voice capability", while stating that they remain focused on Symbian S60 as their smartphone OS. (Nokia had previously released three Mobile Internet devices running Maemo, without cellular network connectivity.)

2010s

2010
 February
 MeeGo is announced, a mobile Linux distribution merging Maemo from Nokia and Moblin from Intel and Linux Foundation, to be hosted by Linux Foundation. MeeGo is not backward-compatible with any previous operating system.
 Samsung introduces the Bada OS and shows the first Bada smartphone, the Samsung S8500. It was later released in May 2010.
 April
 Apple releases the iPad (first generation) with iPhone OS 3.2. This is the first version of the OS to support tablet computers. For its next major version (4.0) iPhone OS will be renamed iOS.
 HP acquires Palm in order to use webOS in multiple new products, including smartphones, tablets, and printers, later stating their intent to use it as the universal platform for all their devices.
 May – Microsoft Kin phone line with KIN OS (based on Windows CE and a "close cousin" to Windows Phone) become available.
 June – Apple releases iOS 4, renamed from iPhone OS, with the iPhone 4.
 July – Microsoft Kin phones and KIN OS are discontinued.
 September
 Apple releases a variant of iOS powering the new 2nd generation Apple TV.
 Symbian^3 is first released on the Nokia N8. This would be Nokia's last flagship device running Symbian (though not their last Symbian phone), before switching to Windows Phone 7 for future flagship phones.
 The Danger Hiptop line and DangerOS are discontinued as a result of Microsoft's acquisition of Danger, Inc. in 2008.
 November
 Nokia assumes full control over Symbian as the Symbian Foundation disintegrates.
 Windows Phone OS is released on Windows Phone 7 phones by HTC, LG, Samsung, and Dell. The new OS is not backward-compatible with the prior Windows Mobile OS.

2011
 February
 Android 3.0 (Honeycomb), the first version to officially support tablet computers, is released on the Motorola Xoom.
 Nokia abandons the Symbian OS and announces that it would use Microsoft's Windows Phone 7 as its primary smartphone platform, while Symbian would be gradually wound down.
 April – BlackBerry Tablet OS, based on QNX Neutrino is released on the BlackBerry PlayBook.
 July
 Mozilla announces their Boot to Gecko project (later named Firefox OS) to develop an OS for handheld devices emphasizing standards-based Web technologies, similar to webOS.
 webOS 3.0, the first version to support tablet computers, is released on the HP TouchPad.
 August – HP announces that webOS device development and production lines would be halted. The last HP webOS version, 3.0.5, is released on January 12, 2012.
 September
 MeeGo is introduced with the limited-release Nokia N9, Nokia's first and only consumer device to use the OS. (A small number of the Nokia N950, a MeeGo phone available only to developers, were released in mid-2011.)
 After Nokia's abandonment of MeeGo, Intel and the Linux Foundation announce a partnership with Samsung to launch Tizen, shifting their focus from MeeGo (Intel and Linux Foundation) and Bada (Samsung) during 2011 and 2012.
 October
 Apple releases iOS 5 with the iPhone 4S, integrating the Siri voice assistant.
 The Mer project is announced, based on an ultra-portable core for building products, composed of Linux, HTML5, QML, and JavaScript, which is derived from the MeeGo codebase.
 November – Fire OS, a fork of the Android operating system, is released by Amazon.com on the Kindle Fire tablet.

2012
 May – Nokia releases the Nokia 808 PureView, later confirmed (in January 2013) to be the last Symbian smartphone. This phone was followed by a single last Symbian software update, "Nokia Belle, Feature Pack 2", later in 2012.
 July
 Finnish start-up Jolla, formed by former Nokia employees, announces that MeeGo's community-driven successor Mer would be the basis of their new Sailfish smartphone OS.
 Mozilla announces that the project formerly named Boot to Gecko (which is built atop an Android Linux kernel using Android drivers and services; however it uses no Java-like code of Android) is now Firefox OS (since discontinued) and has several handset OEMs on board.
 August – Samsung announces they won't ship further phones using their Bada OS, instead focusing on Windows Phone 8 and Android.
 September – Apple releases iOS 6 with the iPhone 5.

2013
 January – BlackBerry releases their new operating system for smartphones, BlackBerry 10, with their Q10 and Z10 smartphones. BlackBerry 10 is not backward-compatible with the BlackBerry OS used on their previous smartphones.
 February – HP sells webOS to LG.
 September – Apple releases iOS 7 with the iPhone 5S and iPhone 5C.
 October
 Canonical announces Ubuntu Touch, a version of the Linux distribution expressly designed for smartphones. The OS is built on the Android Linux kernel, using Android drivers and services, but does not use any of the Java-like code of Android.
 Google releases Android KitKat 4.4.
 November – Jolla releases Sailfish OS on the Jolla smartphone.

2014
 February
 Microsoft releases Windows Phone 8.1
 Nokia introduces their Nokia X platform OS as an Android 4.1.2 Jelly Bean fork on the Nokia X family of smartphones. Similar to Amazon.com's Fire OS, it replaces Google's apps and services with ones from Nokia (such as HERE Maps, Nokia Xpress and MixRadio, and Nokia's own app store) and Microsoft (such as Skype and Outlook), with a user interface that mimics the Windows Phone UI. After the acquisition of Nokia's devices unit, Microsoft announced in July 2014 that no more Nokia X smartphones would be introduced, marking the end of the platform just a few months later.
 August – The Samsung SM-Z9005 Z is the first phone released running Tizen, with v2.2.1 of the OS.
 September
 Apple releases iOS 8 with the iPhone 6 and 6 Plus.
 BlackBerry releases BlackBerry 10 version 10.3 with integration with the Amazon Appstore
 November – Google releases Android 5.0 "Lollipop"

2015
 February – Google releases Android 5.1 "Lollipop".
 April
 LG releases the LG Watch Urbane LTE smartwatch running "LG Wearable Platform OS" based on webOS. This is a version of their Android Wear OS-based LG Watch Urbane, with added LTE connectivity.
 watchOS, based on iOS, is released by Apple with the Apple Watch.
 September
 Apple releases iOS 9 with the iPhone 6S and 6S Plus, iPad Pro, and iPad Mini 4, plus watchOS 2. tvOS 9 is also made distinct from iOS, with its own App Store, launching with Apple TV 4th generation.
 Google releases Android 6.0 "Marshmallow".
 October – BlackBerry announces that there are no plans to release new APIs and software development kits for BlackBerry 10, and future updates would focus on security and privacy enhancements only.
 November – Microsoft releases Windows 10 Mobile.

2016
 February – Microsoft releases the Lumia 650, their last Windows 10 Mobile phone before discontinuing all mobile hardware production the following year.
 July – The BlackBerry Classic, the last device to date running a BlackBerry OS is discontinued. While BlackBerry Limited claimed to still be committed to the BlackBerry 10 operating system, they have since only shipped Android devices after releasing the BlackBerry Priv, their first Android smartphone in November 2015.
 August
 Google posts the Fuchsia source code on GitHub.
 Google releases Android 7.0 "Nougat".
 September – Apple releases iOS 10 with the iPhone 7 and 7 Plus, and watchOS 3 with the Apple Watch Series 1 and 2.
 November
 Tizen releases Tizen 3.0.
 BlackBerry releases BlackBerry 10 version 10.3.3.

2017
 April
Development of Ubuntu Touch is transferred from Canonical Ltd. to the UBports Foundation
Samsung officially launches Android-based Samsung Experience custom firmware starting with version 8.1 on Samsung Galaxy S8.
 May
Samsung announces Tizen 4.0 at Tizen Developer Conference 2017.
 August
Google releases Android 8.0 "Oreo".
 September
Apple releases iOS 11 with the iPhone 8 and 8 Plus and iPhone X, and watchOS 4 with the Apple Watch Series 3.
 October
Microsoft announces that Windows 10 Mobile development is going into maintenance mode only, ending the release of any new features or functionality due to lack of market penetration and resultant lack of interest from app developers, and releases the final major update to it, the "Fall Creators Update."
Cherry Mobile release CherryOS based on Android

2018
 February
Samsung releases Samsung Experience 9.0 based on Android "Oreo" 8.0 globally to Samsung Galaxy S8 and S8+.
 March
 Google and partners officially launches Android Go (based on Android "Oreo" 8.1 but tailored for low-end devices) with Nokia 1, Alcatel 1X, ZTE Tempo Go, General Mobile 8 Go, Micromax Bharat Go and Lava Z50.
 Google releases Android "9" as a developer preview.
 April
Microsoft release Windows 10 Version 1803 "April 2018 Update".
 May
Huawei release LiteOS version 2.1.
 August
 Google releases Android 9.0 "Pie".
 UBPorts released Ubuntu Touch OTA-14, upgrading the OS based on the Canonical's long-term support version of Ubuntu 16.04 LTS "Xenial Xerus".
 Xiaomi officially introduces MIUI for POCO for their Poco series smartphone.
 Samsung officially introduces Tizen 4.0 with the release of Samsung Galaxy Watch series.
 September
 Apple releases iOS 12 with the iPhone XS and XS Max, and watchOS 5 with Apple Watch Series 4.
 Huawei releases EMUI 9.0.
 October
Microsoft releases Windows 10 Version 1809 "October 2018 Update".
 November
Samsung announces the One UI as the latest version of the Samsung Experience UI.
Amazon released Fire OS 6 to supported Fire HD devices.

2019
 January
 Microsoft announces that support for Windows 10 Mobile would end on December 10, 2019, and that Windows 10 Mobile users should migrate to iOS or Android phones.
 June
Apple announces iOS 13, watchOS 6, and iPadOS as a distinct variant of iOS.
 August
 Huawei officially announces HarmonyOS
 September
 Apple releases iOS 13 with the iPhone 11 series, watchOS 6 with Apple Watch Series 5, and iPadOS with the 7th generation iPad.
 Google releases Android 10.
 The Librem 5, the first phone running PureOS, is released.
 October
 Samsung announces the One UI 2.0 as the latest version of their Galaxy Smartphone and Smartwatch UI .
 November
 Microsoft releases the Windows 10 November 10, 2019 Update.

Current software platforms

These operating systems often run atop baseband or other real-time operating systems that handle hardware aspects of the phone.

Android

Android (based on the modified Linux kernel) is a mobile operating system developed by Google. The base system is open-source (and only the kernel copyleft), but the apps and drivers which provide functionality are increasingly becoming closed-source. Besides having the largest installed base worldwide on smartphones, it is also the most popular operating system for general purpose computers (a category that includes desktop computers and mobile devices), even though Android is not a popular operating system for regular (desktop) personal computers (PCs). Although the Android operating system is free and open-source software, in devices sold, much of the software bundled with it (including Google apps and vendor-installed software) is proprietary software and closed-source.

Android's releases before 2.0 (1.0, 1.5, 1.6) were used exclusively on mobile phones. Android 2.x releases were mostly used for mobile phones but also some tablets. Android 3.0 was a tablet-oriented release and does not officially run on mobile phones. Both phone and tablet compatibility were merged with Android 4.0. The current Android version is Android 13, released on August 15, 2022.

BharOS

BharOS is a mobile operating system in India. It is an Indian government-funded project to develop a free and open-source operating system (OS) for use in government and public systems. The Indian Express said it appears to be a forked version of Android. Since "BharOS can run most apps" it is presumably based on the Android Open Source Project.

Android One

Android One, a successor to Google Nexus, is a software experience that runs on the unmodified Android operating system. Unlike most of the "stock" Androids running on the market, the Android One User Interface (UI) closely resembles the Google Pixel UI, due to Android One being a software experience developed by Google and distributed to partners such as Nokia Mobile (HMD) and Xiaomi. Thus, the UI is intended to be as clean as possible. Original equipment manufacturer (OEM) partners may tweak or add additional apps such as cameras to the firmware, but most of the apps are handled proprietarily by Google. Operating system updates are handled by Google and internally tested by OEMs before being distributed via an OTA update to end users.

Current Android One version list
Android One versions follow those of the Android Open Source Project (AOSP), starting from Android 5.0 "Lollipop"

BlackBerry Secure
BlackBerry Secure is an operating system developed by BlackBerry, based on the Android Open Source Project (AOSP). BlackBerry officially announced the name for their Android-based front-end touch interface in August 2017, before which BlackBerry Secure was running on BlackBerry brand devices, such as BlackBerry Priv, DTEK 50/60 and BlackBerry KeyOne. Currently, BlackBerry plans to license out the BlackBerry Secure to other OEMs.

Current BlackBerry Secure version list
 BlackBerry Secure version 1.x - based on Android "Marshmallow" 6.x and "Nougat" 7.x

CalyxOS 
CalyxOS is an operating system for smartphones based on Android with mostly free and open-source software.  It is produced by the Calyx Institute as part of its mission to "defend online privacy, security and accessibility."

ColorOS

ColorOS is a custom front-end touch interface based on the Android Open Source Project (AOSP) and developed by OPPO Electronics Corp. In 2016, OPPO officially released ColorOS with every OPPO and Realme device and released an official ROM for the OnePlus One. Future Realme devices will have their own version of ColorOS.

Current ColorOS version list
 ColorOS 1.x - based on Android "Jelly Bean" 4.2.x and "KitKat" 4.4
 ColorOS 2.x - based on Android "KitKat" 4.4 and "Lollipop" 5
 ColorOS 3.x - based on Android "Lollipop" 5, "Marshmallow" 6, and "Nougat" 7
 ColorOS 5.x - based on Android "Oreo" 8
 ColorOS 6.x - based on Android "Pie" 9
 ColorOS 7.x - based on Android 10
 ColorOS 11.x - based on Android 11
 ColorOS 12.x - based on Android 11 and 12

CopperheadOS
CopperheadOS is a security-hardened version of Android.

DivestOS 
DivestOS is a soft fork of LineageOS. Includes Monthly Updates, FOSS Focus, Deblobbing, Security and Privacy focus, and F-Droid

EMUI

Huawei EMUI is a front-end touch interface developed by Huawei Technologies Co. Ltd. and its sub-brand Honor which is based on Google's Android Open Source Project (AOSP). EMUI is preinstalled on most Huawei and Honor devices. While it was based on the open-source Android operating system, it consists of closed-source proprietary software.

/e/

/e/ is an operating system forked from the source code of LineageOS (based on Android). /e/ targets Android smart phone devices and uses MicroG as a replacement for Google Play Services. /e/OS is not completely open source software, because it comes with the proprietary Magic Earth 'Maps' app.

Fire OS
Amazon Fire OS is a mobile operating system forked from Android and produced by Amazon for its Fire range of tablets, Echo and Echo Dot, and other content delivery devices like Fire TV (previously for their Fire Phone). Fire OS primarily centers on content consumption, with a customized user interface and heavy ties to content available from Amazon's own storefronts and services.

Current Fire OS version list
 Fire OS 1.x
 Fire OS 2.x
 Fire OS 3.x
 Fire OS 4.x
 Fire OS 5.x
 Fire OS 6.x
 Fire OS 7.x

Flyme OS
Flyme OS is an operating system developed by Meizu Technology Co., Ltd., an open-source operating system based on the Android Open Source Project (AOSP). Flyme OS is mainly installed on Meizu smartphones such as the MX series. However, it also has official ROM support for a few Android devices.

Current Flyme OS version list
 Flyme OS 1.x.x (based on Android "Ice Cream Sandwich" 4.0.3, initial release)
 Flyme OS 2.x.x (based on Android "Jelly Bean" 4.1.x – 4.2.x)
 Flyme OS 3.x.x (based on Android "Jelly Bean" 4.3.x)
 Flyme OS 4.x.x (based on Android "KitKat" 4.4.x)
 Flyme OS 5.x.x (based on Android "Lollipop" 5.0.x – 5.1.x)
 Flyme OS 6.x.x (based on Android "Nougat" 7.x, "Marshmallow" 6.0.x and "Lollipop" 5.0.x – 5.1.x for old devices)
 Flyme OS 7.x.x (based on Android "Pie" 9.0, "Oreo" 8.x and "Nougat" 7.x)
 Flyme OS 8.x.x (based on Android 10, "Pie" 9.0, "Oreo" 8.x and "Nougat" 7.x)
 Flyme OS 9.x.x (based on Android 11 and 10)

FuntouchOS
FuntouchOS is a custom user interface developed by Vivo that is based on the Android Open Source Project. FuntouchOS 10.5 had a redesigned UI that resembled stock Androids.

Current FuntouchOS version list
 FuntouchOS 2.x - Based on Android "KitKat" 4.4, Android "Lollipop" 5 and Android "Marshmallow" 6, initial release
 FuntouchOS 3.x - Based on Android "Marshmallow" 6 and Android "Nougat" 7
 FuntouchOS 4.x - Based on Android "Oreo" 8
 FuntouchOS 9.x - Based on Android "Pie" 9
 FuntouchOS 10.x - Based on Android "Pie" 9 and Android 10
 FuntouchOS 10.5 - Based on Android 10 and Android 11, redesigned UI
 FuntouchOS 11.x - Based on Android 10 and Android 11
 FuntouchOS 12.x - Based on Android 11 and Android 12

GrapheneOS

GrapheneOS is a variant of Android for Pixel hardware.

HiOS

HiOS is an Android-based operating system developed by Hong Kong mobile phone manufacturer Tecno Mobile, a subsidiary of Transsion Holdings, exclusively for their smartphones. HiOS allows for a wide range of user customization without requiring rooting the mobile device. The operating system is also bundled with utility applications that allow users to free up memory, freeze applications, limit data accessibility to applications among others. HiOS comes with features like Launcher, Private Safe, Split Screen and Lockscreen Notification.

Current HiOS version list
 HiOS 1.x - based on Android "Marshmallow" 6
 HiOS 2.x - based on Android "Nougat" 7
 HiOS 3.x - based on Android "Nougat" 7
 HiOS 4.x - based on Android "Oreo" 8
 HiOS 5.x - based on Android "Pie" 9
 HiOS 6.x - based on Android 10
 HiOS 7.x - based on Android 10
 HiOS 7.6.x - based on Android 11
 HiOS 8.x - based on Android 11

HTC Sense

HTC Sense is a software suite developed by HTC, used primarily on the company's Android-based devices. Serving as a successor to HTC's TouchFLO 3D software for Windows Mobile, Sense modifies many aspects of the Android user experience, incorporating added features (such as an altered home screen and keyboard), widgets, HTC-developed applications, and redesigned applications. The first device with Sense, the HTC Hero, was released in 2009.

 HTC Sense 1.x (based on Android "Eclair" 2.0/2.1, initial release)
 HTC Sense 2.x (based on Android "Eclair", "Froyo" and "Gingerbread" 2.0/2.1, 2.2.x and 2.3.x, redesigned UI)
 HTC Sense 3.x (based on Android "Gingerbread" 2.3.x, redesigned UI)
 HTC Sense 4.x (based on Android "Ice Cream Sandwich" and "Jelly Bean" 4.0.x and 4.1.x, redesigned UI)
 HTC Sense 5.x (based on Android "Jelly Bean" 4.1.x – 4.3.x, redesigned UI)
 HTC Sense 6.x (based on Android "KitKat" 4.4.x, redesigned UI)
 HTC Sense 7.x (based on Android "Lollipop" 5.0.x, redesigned UI)
 HTC Sense 8.x (based on Android "Marshmallow" 6.0.x, redesigned UI)
 HTC Sense 9.x (based on Android "Nougat" 7.x, redesigned UI)
 HTC Sense 10.x (based on Android "Oreo" 8.x and "Pie" 9.0, redesigned UI)

iQOO UI
iQOO UI is a custom user interface that is based on Vivo's Funtouch OS, which itself is based on the Android Open Source Project (AOSP). The UI mostly resembles its predecessor, but with a customized UI on top of the Funtouch OS.

Current iQOO UI version list
 iQOO UI 1.x - Based on Funtouch OS

Indus OS

Indus OS is a custom mobile operating system based on the Android Open Source Project (AOSP). It is developed by the Indus OS team based in India. No longer valid as of 2018, Indus OS is available on Micromax, Intex, Karbonn, and other Indian smartphone brands.

Current Indus OS version list
 Firstouch OS (based on Android "Lollipop" 5.0)
 Indus OS 2.0 (based on Android "Marshmallow" 6.0)
 Indus OS 3.0 (based on Android "Nougat" 7.0.1)

LG UX

LG UX (formerly Optimus UI) is a front-end touch interface developed by LG Electronics and partners, featuring a full touch user interface. It is not an operating system. LG UX is used internally by LG for sophisticated feature phones and tablet computers, and is not available for licensing by external parties.

Optimus UI 2, based on Android 4.1.2, has been released on the Optimus K II and the Optimus Neo 3. It features a more refined user interface compared to the prior version based on Android 4.1.1, along with new functionalities such as voice shutter and quick memo.

Current LG UX version list
 Optimus UI 1.x – based on Android "Gingerbread" 2.3.x, initial release
 Optimus UI 2.x – based on Android "Ice Cream Sandwich" and "Jelly Bean" 4.0.x and 4.1.x – 4.3.x, redesigned UI
 LG UX 3.x – based on Android "KitKat" and "Lollipop" 4.4.x and 5.0.x, redesigned UI
 LG UX 4.x – based on Android "Lollipop" and "Marshmallow" 5.1.x and 6.0.x, redesigned UI
 LG UX 5.x – based on Android "Marshmallow" and "Nougat" 6.0.x and 7.0.x, redesigned UI
 LG UX 6.x – based on Android "Nougat" 7.0.x, redesigned UI
 LG UX 6.x+ – based on Android "Oreo" 8.0.x, redesigned UI
 LG UX 7.x – based on Android "Oreo" 8.x, redesigned UI
 LG UX 7.x+ – based on Android "Oreo" 8.x., redesigned UI
 LG UX 8.x – based on Android "Pie" 9.0, redesigned UI
 LG UX 9.x – based on Android 10 redesigned UI

LineageOS

Lineage Android Distribution is a custom mobile operating system based on the Android Open Source Project (AOSP). It serves as the successor to the highly popular custom ROM, CyanogenMod, from which it was forked in December 2016 when Cyanogen Inc. announced it was discontinuing development and shut down the infrastructure behind the project. Since Cyanogen Inc. retained the rights to the Cyanogen name, the project rebranded its fork as LineageOS.

Similar to CyanogenMod, it does not include any proprietary apps unless the user installs them. It allows Android users who can no longer obtain update support from their manufacturer to continue updating their OS version to the latest one based on official release from Google AOSP and heavy theme customization.

Magic UI
Magic UI is a front-end touch interface developed by Honor as a subsidiary of Huawei Technologies Co. Ltd before Honor became an independent company.

Magic UI is based on Huawei EMUI, which is based on Google's Android Open Source Project (AOSP). The overall user interface looks almost identical to EMUI, even after the separation. While it was based on the open-source Android operating system, it consists of closed-source proprietary software.

Due to sanctions imposed by the US on Huawei, new devices released by both Huawei and Honor are no longer allowed to include Google Mobile Services. To allow Honor to regain access to Google services, Huawei sold off Honor to become an independent company, thereby allowing them to pre-install Google Mobile Services on their latest devices.

 Magic UI 1.x - Based on EMUI 8 with Android "Oreo" 8 (Initial released)
 Magic UI 2.x - Based on EMUI 9 with Android "Pie" 9 (Minor UI update)
 Magic UI 3.x - Based on EMUI 10 with Android 10 (Minor UI update)
 Magic UI 4.x - Based on EMUI 11 with Android 10 and Android 11 (Minor UI update)
 Magic UI 5.x - Based on EMUI 11 with Android 10 and Android 11 (Minor UI update)
 Magic UI 6.x - Based on EMUI 12 with Android 12 (Major UI redesigned)

Microsoft Launcher
Microsoft Launcher (formerly known as Arrow Launcher) is an application launcher for the Android mobile platform developed by Microsoft and intended to provide a more convenient integration between Windows desktop PCs and Android smartphones. Originally available as a beta in October 2015 and published to the Google Play Store on October 5, 2017. It does not replace the stock Android operating system, but adds an additional graphical layer with a focus on Microsoft applications and services. It was pre-installed on both the Surface Duo and Surface Duo 2.

Starting from Android 12 onwards, the UI on both Surface Duo and Duo 2 has been updated with the Fluent Design System, which closely resemble to those of Windows 11.

MIUI

Mi User Interface (MIUI), developed by the Chinese electronic company Xiaomi, is a mobile operating system based on the Android Open Source Project (AOSP). MIUI is mostly found in Xiaomi smartphones such as the Mi and Redmi Series. However, it also has official ROM support for a few Android devices. Although MIUI is based on AOSP, which is open-source, it consists of closed-source proprietary software.

MIUI for POCO
A specific version of MIUI developed for Xiaomi sub-brand (Currently an independence brand) POCO, the overall experience of the "skin" is similar to those of standard MIUI expect during the early release of MIUI for POCO where compared to standard MIUI it has an app drawer and allowed for 3rd party Android icon customization. Whereas the current MIUI for POCO shared all the common experience with those of standard MIUI, except the icon and the 3rd party icon customization which remained only available to MIUI for POCO.

MyOS
MyOS (formerly called MiFavor) is a custom Android UI developed by ZTE for their flagship smartphones. MyOS is based on the Android Open Source Project (AOSP). This is a redesign from their previous custom Android UI, MiFavor.

Current MyOS version list
 MiFavor 1.x – based on Android "KitKat" 4.4.x, initial release
 MiFavor 2.x – based on Android "Lollipop" 5.0.x – 5.1.x, redesigned UI
 MiFavor 3.x – based on Android "Marshmallow" 6.x, redesigned UI
 MiFavor 4.x – based on Android "Nougat" 7.x, redesigned UI
 MiFavor 5.x – based on Android "Oreo" 8.x, redesigned UI
 MiFavor 9.x – based on Android "Pie" 9.0, redesigned UI
 MiFavor 10.x – based on Android 10, redesigned UI
 MyOS 11.x - based on Android 11, initial release migrate from MiFavor
 MyOS 12.x - based on Android 12, redesigned UI

My UI
My UI (formerly called My UX) is a custom Android UI developed by Motorola for their devices. My UX used to look like the stock Android user experience up until My UI 3.x.

Current My UX version list
 My UX 1.x - based on Android 10, initial release
 My UI 2.x - based on Android 11
 My UI 3.x - based on Android 12
 My UI 4.x - based on Android 12

Nothing OS
Nothing OS is a custom Android UI developed by Nothing for their Nothing Phone (1). Nothing OS design interface are identical to the stock Android and Pixel UI experience, aside from their custom font and widget which is based on dot design.

Current My UX version list
 Nothing OS 1 - based on Android 12, initial release
 Nothing OS 1.5 - based on Android 13

nubia UI
nubia UI is a custom Android UI developed by ZTE and nubia for their smartphones. nubia UI is based on the Android Open Source Project (AOSP).

Current nubia UI version list
 Nubia UI 6.x - based on Android 8 "Oreo"
 Nubia UI 7.x - based on Android 9 "Pie"
 nubia UI 8.x - based on Android 10
 nubia UI 9.x - based on Android 11

One UI

One UI (formerly called TouchWiz and Samsung Experience) is a front-end touch interface developed by Samsung Electronics in 2008 with partners, featuring a full touch user interface. It is not a true operating system, but a user experience. Samsung Experience is used internally by Samsung for smartphones, feature phones and tablet computers, and is not available for licensing by external parties. The Android version of Samsung Experience also came with Samsung-made apps preloaded until the Galaxy S6, which removed all Samsung pre-loaded apps except Samsung Galaxy Store (formerly Galaxy Apps) to save storage space due to the removal of its MicroSD. With the release of Samsung Galaxy S8 and S8+, Samsung Experience 8.1 was preinstalled on it with new functions, known as Samsung DeX. Similar to the concept of Microsoft Continuum, Samsung DeX allowed high-end Galaxy devices such as S8/S8+ or Note 8 to connect into a docking station, which extends the device to allow desktop-like functionality by connecting a keyboard, mouse, and monitor. Samsung also announced "Linux on Galaxy", which allows users to use the standard Linux distribution on the DeX platform.

Previous Samsung Android UI version list
 TouchWiz 3.x (based on Android 2.1 "Éclair" and Android 2.2 "Froyo") (Initial release for Android UI)
 TouchWiz 4.x (based on Android 2.3 "Gingerbread" and Android 3.0 "Honeycomb") (Minor UI update)
 TouchWiz Nature UX (based on Android 4.0 "Ice Cream Sandwich") (Minor UI update)
 TouchWiz Nature UX 2.x (based on Android 4.2 "Jellybean") (Minor UI update)
 TouchWiz Nature UX 3.x (based on Android 4.4 "KitKat") (Minor UI update)
 TouchWiz Nature UX 4.x (based on Android 5 "Lollipop") (Minor UI update)
 TouchWiz Nature UX 5.x (based on Android 5 "Lollipop") (Major UI update)
 TouchWiz Nature UX 6.x (based on Android 6 "Marshmallow") (Minor UI update)
 TouchWiz Grace UX (based on Android 6 "Marshmallow") (Major UI update)
 Samsung Experience 8.x (based on Android 7 "Nougat") (Initial release migrate from TouchWiz)
 Samsung Experience 9.x (based on Android 8 "Oreo") (Minor update)
 Samsung Experience 10.x (based on Android 9 "Pie) (Minor and Last update before redesign One UI)

Current One UI version list
 One UI 1.x (based on Android 9 "Pie") (Initial release)
 One UI 2.x (based on Android 10) (Minor UI update)
 One UI 3.x (based on Android 11) (Minor UI update)
 One UI 4.x (based on Android 12) (Minor UI update)

Origin OS
Origin OS is a custom user interface developed by Vivo that is based on Android. It is a redesigned skin of Funtouch OS. It is currently only available in China but may someday be released globally.

Current Origin OS version list
 Origin OS 1.0 - based on Android 10 and Android 11 (initial release)
 Origin OS Ocean - based on Android 12
 Origin OS HD - based on Android 12 (currently only used in Vivo Pad)

OxygenOS

OxygenOS is based on the open source Android Open Source Project (AOSP) and is developed by OnePlus to replace Cyanogen OS on OnePlus devices such as the OnePlus One. It is preinstalled on the OnePlus 2, OnePlus X, OnePlus 3, OnePlus 3T, OnePlus 5, OnePlus 5T, and OnePlus 6. As stated by Oneplus, OxygenOS is focused on stabilizing and maintaining of stock Android functionalities like those found on Nexus devices. It consists of mainly Google apps and minor UI customization to maintain the sleekness of stock Android.

Current OxygenOS version list
 Oxygen OS 1.0.x (based on Android 5.0.x "Lollipop") (initial release)
 Oxygen OS 2.0.x (based on Android 5.1.x "Lollipop") (overall maintenance update)
 Oxygen OS 3.0.x (based on Android 6.0 "Marshmallow") (major Android update)
 Oxygen OS 3.1.x (based on Android 6.0.1 "Marshmallow") (minor maintenance update)
 Oxygen OS 3.2.x (based on Android 6.0.1 "Marshmallow") (major Android update)
 Oxygen OS 4.x.x (based on Android 7.x "Nougat") (major Android update)
 Oxygen OS 5.x.x (based on Android 8.x "Oreo") (major Android update)
 Oxygen OS 9.x.x (based on Android 9.0 "Pie") (major Android update)
 Oxygen OS 10.x.x (based on Android 10.0 "10") (major Android update)
 Oxygen OS 11.x.x (based on Android 11.0 "11") (major Android update)
 Oxygen OS 12.x.x (based on Android 12.0 "12") (major Android update)

Pixel UI (Pixel Launcher)
Google Pixel UI or Pixel Launcher is developed by Google and based on the open-source Android system. Unlike Nexus phones, where Google shipped with stock Android, the UI that came with first-generation Pixel phones was slightly modified. As part of the Google Pixel software, the Pixel UI and its home launcher are closed-source and proprietary, so it is only available on Pixel family devices. However, third-party mods allow non-Pixel smartphones to install Pixel Launcher with Google Now feed integration.

Current Google Pixel Launcher version list
 Pixel Launcher – "7.1.1" (based on Android 7.x "Nougat") (Initial release)
 Pixel Launcher – "8.1.0" (based on Android 8.x "Oreo") (Minor UI update)
 Pixel Launcher – "9.0" (based on Android 9.0 "Pie") (Minor UI update)
 Pixel Launcher – "10.0" (based on Android 10.0 "10") (Moderate UI update that support themes)
 Pixel Launcher – "11.0" (based on Android 11.0 "11") (Minor UI update)
 Pixel Launcher – "12.0" (based on Android 12.0 "12") (Major UI update)

realme UI
realme UI is a mobile operating system developed by Realme which is based on OPPO ColorOS, which itself is based on the Android Open Source Project (AOSP). The UI mostly resemble its predecessor, but with a custom UI on top of ColorOS to match Realme's target audience.

Current realme UI version list
 realme UI 1.0 - Based on ColorOS 7.0 - Android 10 - Initial Release
 realme UI 2.0 - Based on ColorOS 11.0 - Android 11
 realme UI 3.0 - Based on ColorOS 12.0 - Android 12

realme UI R edition
realme UI R edition is a custom Android skin that Realme developed for their lower-end device line with "C" and Narzo series, the Android based line of is based on Android Go, hence the overall experience is tune down to allowed for smoother experience on budget Realme devices.

Red Magic OS
Red Magic OS is a mobile operating system developed by ZTE and Nubia for their Red Magic devices.

Current Red Magic OS version list

 Red Magic OS 1.x - based on Android 8 "Oreo", initial release
 Red Magic OS 2.x - based on Android 9 "Pie", redesigned UI
 Red Magic OS 3.x - based on Android 10, redesigned UI
 Red Magic OS 4.x - based on Android 11, redesigned UI
 Red Magic OS 5.x - based on Android 12, redesigned UI

Replicant OS

Replicant is a custom mobile operating system based on the Android with all proprietary drivers and bloated closed-source software removed.

TCL UI
TCL UI is a custom user interface developed by TCL Technology for their in-house smartphone series. The OS is based on the Android Open Source Project (AOSP).

Current TCL UI version list
 TCL UI 1.x - Based on Android 9 "Pie" and Android 10 - Initial Release
 TCL UI 2.x - Based on Android 10 - Minor UI upgrade
 TCL UI 3.x - Based on Android 11 - Minor UI upgrade
 TCL UI 4.x - Based on Android 12 - Minor UI upgrade

VOS
VOS is a custom Android UI developed by BQ Aquaris and Vsmart.

Current VOS version list:
 VOS 1.x - based on Android "Nougat" 7.1, "Oreo" 8
 VOS 2.x - based on Android "Pie" 9
 VOS 3.x - based on Android 10
 VOS 4.x - based on Android 11

XOS
XOS (formerly known as XUI) is an Android-based operating system developed by Hong Kong mobile phone manufacturer Infinix Mobile, a subsidiary of Transsion Holdings, exclusively for their smartphones. XOS allows for a wide range of user customization without requiring rooting the mobile device. The operating system comes with utility applications that allow users to protect their privacy, improve speed, enhance their experience, etc. XOS comes with features like XTheme, Scan to Recharge, Split Screen and XManager.

Current XOS version list:
 XUI 1.x - based on Android "Lollipop" 5, initial release
 XOS 2.x - based on Android "Marshmallow" 6 and "Nougat" 7
 XOS 3.x - based on Android "Nougat" 7 and "Oreo" 8
 XOS 4.x - based on Android "Oreo" 8
 XOS 5.x - based on Android "Pie" 9
 XOS 6.x - based on Android 10
 XOS 7.x - based on Android 10
 XOS 7.6.x - based on Android 11
 XOS 10.x - based on Android 11, redesigned UI
 XOS 10.6.x - based on Android 12, latest update

Xperia UI
Sony Xperia UI (formerly known as Sony Ericsson Timescape UI) was the front-end UI developed by Sony Mobile (formerly Sony Ericsson) in 2010 for their Android-based Sony Xperia series. Sony Xperia UI mostly consisted of Sony's own applications such as Sony Music (formerly known as Walkman Music player), Albums and Video Player. During its time as Timescape UI, the UI differed from the standard Android UIinstead of traditional apps dock on the bottom part, they were located at the four corners of the home screen, while the middle of the screen consisted of the widget. However, recent UI developments more closely resemble those of stock Android.

Current Xperia UI version list:
 Timescape version 1 – based on Android "Eclair" 2.0/2.1, initial release
 Timescape version 2 – based on Android "Gingerbread" 2.3.x, redesigned UI
 Xperia UI version 3 – based on Android "Gingerbread" and "Ice Cream Sandwich" 2.3.x and 4.0.x, redesigned UI
 Xperia UI version 4 – based on Android "Jelly Bean" 4.2.x – 4.3.x, redesigned UI
 Xperia UI version 5 – based on Android "KitKat" 4.4.x, redesigned UI
 Xperia UI version 6 – based on Android "Lollipop" 5.0.x – 5.1.x, redesigned UI
 Xperia UI version 7 – based on Android "Marshmallow" 6.0.x, redesigned UI
 Xperia UI version 8 – based on Android "Nougat" 7.x, redesigned UI
 Xperia UI version 9 – based on Android "Oreo" 8.x, redesigned UI

ZenUI

ZenUI is a front-end touch interface developed by ASUS with partners, featuring a full touch user interface. ZenUI is used by ASUS for its Android phones and tablet computers, and is not available for licensing by external parties. ZenUI also comes preloaded with ASUS-made apps like ZenLink (PC Link, Share Link, Party Link & Remote Link).

Current ZenUI version list:
ZenUI 1.0 – based on Android "Jelly Bean" and "KitKat" 4.3.x and 4.4.x, initial release
ZenUI 2.0 – based on Android "Lollipop" 5.0.x – 5.1.x, redesigned UI
ZenUI 3.0 – based on Android "Marshmallow" 6.0.x, redesigned UI
ZenUI 4.0 – based on Android "Nougat" 7.x, redesigned UI
ZenUI 5.0 – based on Android "Oreo" 8.x, redesigned UI
ZenUI 6.0 – based on Android "Pie" 9.0, redesigned UI
ZenUI 7.0 – based on Android 10, redesigned UI
ZenUI 8.0 – based on Android 11, redesigned UI

ZUI
ZUI is a custom operating system originally developed by Lenovo subsidiary ZUK Mobile for their smartphones. However, after the shutting down of ZUK Mobile, Lenovo took over as the main developer of ZUI. The operating system is based on the Android Open Source Project (AOSP).

Current ZUI version list:
 ZUI  1.x - Initial Release
 ZUI  2.x
 ZUI  3.x
 ZUI  4.x
 ZUI  4.x
 ZUI 10.x (Based on Android 9 "Pie")
 ZUI 11.x (Based on Android 9 "Pie" and Android 10)
 ZUI 12.x (Based on Android 11)
 ZUI 13.x (Based on Android 11)

Wear OS

Wear OS (also known simply as Wear and formerly Android Wear) is a version of Google's Android operating system designed for smartwatches and other wearables. By pairing with mobile phones running Android version 6.0 or newer, or iOS version 10.0 or newer with limited support from Google's pairing application, Wear OS integrates Google Assistant technology and mobile notifications into a smartwatch form factor.

In May 2021 at Google I/O, Google announced a major update to the platform, internally known as Wear OS 3.0. It incorporates a new visual design inspired by Android 12, and Fitbit exercise tracking features. Google also announced a partnership with Samsung Electronics, who is collaborating with Google to unify its Tizen-based smartwatch platform with Wear OS, and has committed to using Wear OS on its future smartwatch products. The underlying codebase was also upgraded to Android 11. Wear OS 3.0 will be available to Wear OS devices running Qualcomm Snapdragon Wear 4100 system on chip, and will be an opt-in upgrade requiring a factory reset to install.

Current Wear OS version list:

 Android Wear 4.4w (Based on Android 4.4 "KitKat") - (Initially release)
 Android Wear 1.0 - 1.3 (Based on Android 5.0 "Lollipop) - (Minor update)
 Android Wear 1.4 (Based on Android 6.0 "Marshmallow) - (Minor update)
 Android Wear 2.0 - 2.6 (7.1.1W2) (Based on Android 7.1 "Nougat") - (Minor update)
 Android Wear 2.6 (7.1.1W3, 8.0.0 W1) - 2.9 (7.1.1W6, 8.0.0W4) (Baded on Android 8.0 "Oreo") - (Minor update)
 Wear OS 1.0 (Based on Android 8.0 "Oreo") - (Renamed and Minor update)
 Wear OS 2.0 (Based on Android 8.0 "Oreo") - (Minor update)
 Wear OS 2.2 (Based on Android 9.0 "Pie") - (Minor update)
 Wear OS 3.0 (Based on Android 11) - (Major UI and system update)

One UI Watch
One UI Watch is the user interface Samsung developed for their Wear OS based smartwatch, officially announced after both Google and Samsung confirmed they would unify their respective wearable operating systems (Google Wear OS 2.0 and Samsung Tizen) into Wear OS 3.0.

Current One UI Watch version list:

 One UI Watch 3.0 (Based on Wear OS 3.0 - Android 11)(Initially release)

ChromeOS

ChromeOS is an operating system designed by Google that is based on the Linux kernel and uses the Google Chrome web browser as its principal user interface. As a result, ChromeOS primarily supports web applications. Google announced the project in July 2009, conceiving it as an operating system in which both applications and user data reside in the cloud: hence ChromeOS primarily runs web applications.

Due to increase of popularity with 2-in-1 PCs, most recent Chromebooks are introduced with touch screen capability, with Android applications starting to become available for the operating system in 2014. And in 2016, access to Android apps in the entire Google Play Store was introduced on supported ChromeOS devices. With the support of Android applications, there are Chromebook devices that are positioned as tablet based instead of notebooks.

ChromeOS is only available pre-installed on hardware from Google manufacturing partners. An open source equivalent, ChromiumOS, can be compiled from downloaded source code. Early on, Google provided design goals for ChromeOS, but has not otherwise released a technical description.

Sailfish OS

Sailfish OS is from Jolla. It is open source with GNU General Public License (GPL) for middleware stack core which comes from MER. Sailfish due to Jolla's business model and due to alliances with various partners and due to intentional design of OS internals, is capable to adopt in several layers third-party software including Jolla software e.g. Jolla's UI is proprietary software (closed source), so such components can be proprietary with many kinds of licences. However, user can replace them with open source components like e.g. NEMO UI instead Jolla's UI.

After Nokia abandoned in 2011 the MeeGo project, most of the MeeGo team left Nokia, and established Jolla as a company to use MeeGo and Mer business opportunities. The MER standard allows it to be launched on any hardware with kernel compatible with MER. In 2012, Linux Sailfish OS based on MeeGo and using middleware of MER core stack distribution was launched for public use. The first device, the Jolla smartphone, was unveiled on May 20, 2013. In 2015, Jolla Tablet was launched and the BRICS countries declared it an officially supported OS there. Jolla started licensing Sailfish OS 2.0 for third parties. Some devices sold are updateable to Sailfish 2.0 with no limits.

Nemo Mobile is a community-driven OS, similar to Sailfish but attempting to replace its proprietary components, such as the user interface.

Each Sailfish OS version release is named after a Finnish lake:

Tizen

Tizen (based on the Linux kernel) is a mobile operating system hosted by Linux Foundation, together with support from the Tizen Association, guided by a Technical Steering Group composed of Intel and Samsung.

Tizen is an operating system for devices including smartphones, tablets, In-Vehicle Infotainment (IVI) devices, however currently it mainly focuses on wearable and smart TVs. It is an open source system (however the SDK was closed-source and proprietary) that aims to offer a consistent user experience across devices. Tizen's main components are the Linux kernel and the WebKit runtime. According to Intel, Tizen "combines the best of LiMo and MeeGo." HTML5 apps are emphasized, with MeeGo encouraging its members to transition to Tizen, stating that the "future belongs to HTML5-based applications, outside of a relatively small percentage of apps, and we are firmly convinced that our investment needs to shift toward HTML5." Tizen will be targeted at a variety of platforms such as handsets, touch pc, smart TVs and in-vehicle entertainment. On May 17, 2013, Tizen released version 2.1, code-named Nectarine.

While Tizen itself was open source, most of the UX and UI layer that was developed by Samsung was mainly closed-source and proprietary, such as the TouchWiz UI on the Samsung Z's series smartphone and One UI for their Galaxy Watch wearable lines.

KaiOS

KaiOS is from Kai. It is based on Firefox OS/Boot to Gecko. Unlike most mobile operating systems which focus on smartphones, KaiOS was developed mainly for feature phones, giving these access to more advanced technologies usually found on smartphones, such as app stores and Wi-Fi/4G capabilities.

It is a mix of closed-source and open-source components. FirefoxOS/B2G was released under the permissive MPL 2.0. It does not redistribute itself under the same license, so KaiOS is now presumably proprietary (but still mostly open-source, publishing its source code). KaiOS is not entirely proprietary, as it uses the copyleft GPL Linux kernel also used in Android.

Smart Feature OS
Smart Feature OS is a custom version of KaiOS that was developed and solely used by HMD Global for their KaiOS line of Nokia feature phone, the main differences between stock KaiOS and Smart Feature OS is mainly on the atheistic such as the icon and some UI element, including custom Nokia ringtone and notification tone.

Fully open-source, entirely permissive licenses

Fuchsia

Fuchsia is a capability-based, real-time operating system (RTOS) currently being developed by Google. It was first discovered as a mysterious code post on GitHub in August 2016, without any official announcement. In contrast to prior Google-developed operating systems such as ChromeOS and Android, which are based on Linux kernels, Fuchsia is based on a new microkernel called "Zircon", derived from "Little Kernel", a small operating system intended for embedded systems. This allows it to remove Linux and the copyleft GPL under which the Linux kernel is licensed; Fuchsia is licensed under the permissive BSD 3-clause, Apache 2.0, and MIT licenses. Upon inspection, media outlets noted that the code post on GitHub suggested Fuchsia's capability to run on universal devices, from embedded systems to smartphones, tablets and personal computers. In May 2017, Fuchsia was updated with a user interface, along with a developer writing that the project was not a for experimental, prompting media speculation about Google's intentions with the operating system, including the possibility of it replacing Android.

LiteOS

LiteOS is a lightweight open source real-time operating system which is part of Huawei's "1+2+1" Internet of Things solution, which is similar to Google Android Things and Samsung Tizen. It is released under the permissive BSD 3-clause license. Huawei LiteOS features lightweight, low-power, fast-response, multi-sensor collaboration, multi-protocol interconnect connectivity, enabling IoT terminals to quickly access the network. Huawei LiteOS will make intelligent hardware development easier. Thereby accelerating the realization of the interconnection of all things. Currently LiteOS are introduce to the consumer market with the Huawei Watch GT series and their sub-brand Honor Magic Watch series.

OpenHarmony

OpenHarmony is an open-source version of HarmonyOS developed and donated by Huawei to the OpenAtom Foundation. It supports devices running a mini system with memory as small as 128 KB, or running a standard system with memory greater than 128 MB. The open source HarmonyOS is based on the Huawei LiteOS kernel. OpenHarmony LiteOS Cortex-A brings small-sized, low-power, and high-performance experience and builds a unified and open ecosystem for developers. In addition, it provides rich kernel mechanisms, more comprehensive Portable Operating System Interface (POSIX), and a unified driver framework, Hardware Driver Foundation (HDF), which offers unified access for device developers and friendly development experience for application developers.

Fully open-source, mixed copyleft and permissive licenses

Fedora Mobility
Fedora Mobility is under developing mobile operating system by the Fedora Project that are porting Fedora to run on portable devices such as phones and tablets.

LuneOS

LuneOS is a modern reimplementation of the Palm/HP webOS interface.

Manjaro ARM
Manjaro ARM is a mobile operating system with Plasma Mobile desktop environment that is running and default operating system on the PinePhone, an ARM-based smartphone released by Pine64.

Mobian
A mobile Debian focused for PinePhone and soon Librem.

Plasma mobile

Plasma Mobile is a Plasma variant for smartphones. Plasma Mobile runs on Wayland and it is compatible with Ubuntu Touch applications, PureOS applications, and eventually Android applications via KDE's Shashlik project also sponsored by Blue Systems, or Anbox. It is under the copyleft GPLv2 license.

The Necuno phone uses Plasma Mobile. It is entirely open-source and thus does not have a cellular modem, so it must make calls by VOIP, like a pocket computer.

PostmarketOS

PostmarketOS is based on the Alpine Linux Linux distribution. It is intended to run on older phone hardware.  it is in alpha.

PureOS

PureOS is a Debian GNU/Linux derivative using only free software meeting the Debian Free Software Guidelines, mainly the copyleft GPL. PureOS is endorsed by Free Software Foundation as one of the freedom-respecting operating systems. It is developed by Purism, and was already in use on Purism's laptops before it was used on the Librem 5 smartphone. Purism, in partnership with GNOME and KDE, aims to separate the CPU from the baseband processor and include hardware kill switches for the phone's Wi-Fi, Bluetooth, camera, microphone, and baseband processor, and provide both GNOME and KDE Plasma Mobile as options for the desktop environment.

Ubuntu Touch
Ubuntu Touch is an open-source (GPL) mobile version of the Ubuntu operating system originally developed in 2013 by Canonical Ltd. and continued by the non-profit UBports Foundation in 2017. Ubuntu Touch can run on a pure GNU/Linux base on phones with the required drivers, such as the Librem 5 and the PinePhone. To enable hardware that was originally shipped with Android, Ubuntu Touch makes use of the Android Linux kernel, using Android drivers and services via an LXC container, but does not use any of the Java-like code of Android. As of February 2022, Ubuntu Touch is available on 78 phones and tablets. The UBports Installer serves as an easy-to-use tool to allow inexperienced users to install the operating system on third-party devices without damaging their hardware.

Closed source

iOS 

iOS (formerly named iPhone OS) was created by Apple Inc. It has the second largest installed base worldwide on smartphones, but the largest profits, due to aggressive price competition between Android-based manufacturers. It is closed-source and proprietary, and is built on the open source Darwin operating system. The iPhone, iPod Touch, iPad, and second and third-generation Apple TV all use iOS, which is derived from macOS.

Native third-party applications were not officially supported until the release of iPhone OS 2.0 on July 11, 2008. Before this, "jailbreaking" allowed third-party applications to be installed. In recent years, the jailbreaking scene has changed drastically due to Apple's continued efforts to secure their operating system and prevent unauthorized modifications. Currently, jailbreaks of recent iterations of iOS are only semi-untethered, which requires a device to be re-jailbroken at every boot, and exploits for jailbreaks are becoming increasingly hard to find and use.

Currently all iOS devices are developed by Apple and manufactured by Foxconn or another of Apple's partners.

iPadOS 

iPadOS is a tablet operating system created and developed by Apple Inc. specifically for their iPad line of tablet computers. It was announced at the company's 2019 Worldwide Developers Conference (WWDC), as a derivation from iOS but with a greater emphasis put on multitasking. It was released on September 24, 2019.

watchOS 

watchOS is the operating system of the Apple Watch, developed by Apple Inc. It is based on the iOS operating system and has many similar features. It was released on April 24, 2015, along with the Apple Watch, the only device that runs watchOS. It is currently the most widely used wearable operating system. Its features focus on convenience, such as being able to place phone calls and send texts, and health, such as fitness and heart rate tracking.

The most current version of the watchOS operating system is watchOS 8.

bridgeOS 
bridgeOS is a mobile operating system created and developed by Apple Inc. for use exclusively with its hardware. bridgeOS runs on the T series Apple silicon processors and operates the OLED touchscreen strip called the "Touch Bar" as well as multiple other functions, including managing the encrypted data in their Secure Enclave and acting as a gatekeeper and video codec to the device's cameras. bridgeOS is a heavily modified version of Apple's watchOS.

Kindle firmware 

Kindle firmware is a mobile operating system specifically designed for Amazon Kindle e-readers. It is based on a custom Linux kernel, however. It is entirely closed-source and proprietary.

HarmonyOS 

HarmonyOS is a distributed operating system developed by Huawei that was specifically designed for smartphones, tablets, TVs, smartwatches, smart devices of Huawei brand and its ecosystem. It is based on a proprietary multi-kernel and Linux kernel subsystem. Released officially for smartphones on June 2, 2021, from its initial launch on August 9, 2019, for smart screen TVs.

Nintendo Switch system software 
The Nintendo Switch system software (also known by its codename Horizon) is an updatable firmware and operating system used by the Nintendo Switch hybrid video game console/tablet and Nintendo Switch Lite handheld game console. It is based on a proprietary microkernel. The UI includes a HOME screen, consisting of the top bar, the screenshot viewer ("Album"), and shortcuts to the Nintendo eShop, News, and Settings.

PlayStation Vita system software 
The PlayStation Vita system software is the official firmware and operating system for the PlayStation Vita and PlayStation TV video game consoles. It uses the LiveArea as its graphical shell. The PlayStation Vita system software has one optional add-on component, the PlayStation Mobile Runtime Package. The system is built on a Unix-base which is derived from FreeBSD and NetBSD. Due to it capabilities on browsing the internet and multimedia capabilities, it is treat as an gaming tablet or tablet replacement by community and reviewer/publisher.

Intel Management Engine 
The Intel Management Engine (ME), also known as the Intel Manageability Engine, is an autonomous subsystem that has been incorporated in virtually all of Intel's processor chipsets since 2008. It is located in the Platform Controller Hub of modern Intel motherboards.

While not an actual operating system or even a mobile one, the firmware which installed in the microprocessor was in fact based on the Minix 3 operating system, starting with Intel ME 11. Due to it was install on the mobile (Laptop) version of Intel chips, hence it can considered as a mobile operating system that running on the subsystem of the microprocessor of a mobile devices.

Windows 10 

Windows 10 (not to be confused with Windows 10 Mobile—see below) is a personal computer operating system developed and released by Microsoft as part of the Windows NT family of operating systems. It was released on July 29, 2015, and many editions and versions have been released since then. Just like its predecessors, it was designed to run across multiple Microsoft product such as PCs and Tablets. The Windows user interface was revised to handle transitions between a mouse-oriented interface and a touchscreen-optimized interface based on available input devices‍—‌particularly on 2-in-1 PCs.

Windows 10 also introduces the universal apps, expanding on Metro-style apps, these apps can be designed to run across multiple Microsoft product families with nearly identical code‍—‌including PCs, tablets, smartphones, embedded systems, Xbox One, Surface Hub and Mixed Reality.

Windows 11 

Windows 11 is a major version of the Windows NT operating system developed by Microsoft that was announced on June 24, 2021, and is the successor to Windows 10, which was released n 2015. Windows 11 was released on October 5, 2021, as a free upgrade via Windows Update for eligible devices running Windows 10.

Microsoft promoted that Windows 11 would have improved performance and ease of use over Windows 10; it features major changes to the Windows shell influenced by the canceled Windows 10X, including a redesigned Start menu, the replacement of its "live tiles" with a separate "Widgets" panel on the taskbar, the ability to create tiled sets of windows that can be minimized and restored from the taskbar as a group, and new gaming technologies inherited from Xbox Series X and Series S such as Auto HDR and DirectStorage on compatible hardware. Internet Explorer is fully replaced by the Blink layout engine-based Microsoft Edge, while Microsoft Teams is integrated into the Windows shell. Microsoft also announced plans to offer support for Android apps to run on Windows 11, with support for Amazon Appstore and manually-installed packages.

Similar to Windows 10, it was designed to run across multiple Microsoft product such as PCs and Tablets. The Windows user interface was further revised to combine the UI element of both mouse-oriented interface and a touchscreen-optimized interface based into a hybrid UI that combined touch and traditional desktop UI.

Minor proprietary operating systems 
Other than the major mobile operating systems from the major tech companies, some companies such as Huami (Amazfit), Huawei, realme, TCL, and Xiaomi have developed their own proprietary RTOSes specifically for their own smartbands and smartwatches that are designed to be power efficient and low battery consumption and are not based on Android or Linux Kernel.

Proprietary Amazfit OS
Operating System that is primarily designed for their Bip series, however, Huami is currently developing the operating system to run on other company smartwatches as well.
(Not to be confused with the Android-based Amazfit OS as both of them sharing the name yet both are based on different operating system, for their Android-based Amazfit OS, kindly refer to the Android section)

Huawei/Honor Band Operating System
Huawei Band Operating system is an operating system specifically designed and developed by Huawei for their fitness tracker, including smartband series from Honor.
(Not to be confused with another RTOS (LiteOS) which was also developed by Huawei.)

Lenovo RTOS
Proprietary OS develop by Lenovo for their fitness tracker and smartwatch.

realme Wearable Operating System
A proprietary operating system design to run on realme smartband and smartwatch.

TCL Wearable Real Time Operating System
A proprietary RTOS powering TCL and Alcatel brand smartband and smartwatch.

Xiaomi Mi Band Operating System
Proprietary RTOS that is develop by Huami for Xiaomi Mi Band series.
(Not to be confused with Xiaomi MIUI for smartwatch which is based on Wear OS)

Discontinued software platforms

Open source

CyanogenMod

CyanogenMod was a custom mobile operating system based on the Android Open Source Project (AOSP). It was a custom ROM that was co-developed by the CyanogenMod community. The OS did not include any proprietary apps unless the user installed them. Due to its open source nature, CyanogenMod allowed Android users who could no longer obtain update support from their manufacturer to continue updating their OS version to the latest one based on official releases from Google AOSP and heavy theme customization. The last version of the OS was CyanogenMod 13 which was based on Android Asus

On December 24, 2016, CyanogenMod announced on their blog that they would no longer be releasing any CyanogenMod updates. All development moved to LineageOS.

Cyanogen OS
Cyanogen OS was based on CyanogenMod and maintained by Cyanogen Inc; however, it included proprietary apps and it was only available for commercial uses.

Firefox OS

Firefox OS (formerly known as "Boot to Gecko" and shortly "B2G") is from Mozilla. It was an open source mobile operating system released under the Mozilla Public License built on the Android Linux kernel and used Android drivers, but did not use any Java-like code of Android.

According to Ars Technica, "Mozilla says that B2G is motivated by a desire to demonstrate that the standards-based open Web has the potential to be a competitive alternative to the existing single-vendor application development stacks offered by the dominant mobile operating systems." In September 2016, Mozilla announced that work on Firefox OS has ceased, and all B2G-related code would be removed from mozilla-central.

MeeGo/Maemo/Moblin

MeeGo was from non-profit organization The Linux Foundation. It is open source and GPL. At the 2010 Mobile World Congress in Barcelona, Nokia and Intel both unveiled MeeGo, a mobile operating system that combined Moblin and Maemo to create an open-sourced experience for users across all devices. In 2011 Nokia announced that it would no longer pursue MeeGo in favor of Windows Phone. Nokia announced the Nokia N9 on June 21, 2011, at the Nokia Connection event in Singapore. LG announced its support for the platform. Maemo was a platform developed by Nokia for smartphones and Internet tablets. It is open source and GPL, based on Debian GNU/Linux and draws much of its graphical user interface (GUI), frameworks, and libraries from the GNOME project. It uses the Matchbox window manager and the GTK-based Hildon as its GUI and application framework.

webOS

webOS was developed by Palm. webOS is an open source mobile operating system running on the Linux kernel, initially developed by Palm, which launched with the Palm Pre. After being acquired by HP, two phones (the Veer and the Pre 3) and a tablet (the TouchPad) running webOS were introduced in 2011. On August 18, 2011, HP announced that webOS hardware would be discontinued, but would continue to support and update webOS software and develop the webOS ecosystem. HP released webOS as open source under the name Open webOS, and plans to update it with additional features. On February 25, 2013, HP announced the sale of webOS to LG Electronics, who used the operating system for its "smart" or Internet-connected TVs. However, HP retained patents underlying WebOS and cloud-based services such as the App Catalog.

Closed source

Bada

Bada platform (stylized as bada; Korean: 바다) was an operating system for mobile devices such as smartphones and tablet computers. It was developed by Samsung Electronics. Its name is derived from "바다 (bada)", meaning "ocean" or "sea" in Korean. It ranges from mid- to high-end smartphones. To foster adoption of Bada OS, since 2011 Samsung reportedly has considered releasing the source code under an open-source license, and expanding device support to include Smart TVs. Samsung announced in June 2012 intentions to merge Bada into the Tizen project, but would meanwhile use its own Bada operating system, in parallel with Google Android OS and Microsoft Windows Phone, for its smartphones. All Bada-powered devices are branded under the Wave name, but not all of Samsung's Android-powered devices are branded under the name Galaxy.
On February 25, 2013, Samsung announced that it will stop developing Bada, moving development to Tizen instead. Bug reporting was finally terminated in April 2014.

BlackBerry OS
In 1999, Research In Motion released its first BlackBerry devices, providing secure real-time push-email communications on wireless devices. Services such as BlackBerry Messenger provide the integration of all communications into a single inbox. In September 2012, RIM announced that the 200 millionth BlackBerry smartphone was shipped. As of September 2014, there were around 46 million active BlackBerry service subscribers. In the early 2010s, RIM has undergone a platform transition, changing its company name to BlackBerry Limited and making new devices on a new platform named "BlackBerry 10".

BlackBerry 10

BlackBerry 10 (based on the QNX OS) is from BlackBerry. As a smartphone OS, it is closed-source and proprietary, and only runs on phones and tablets manufactured by BlackBerry.

One of the dominant platforms in the world in the late 2000s, its global market share was reduced significantly by the mid-2010s. In late 2016, BlackBerry announced that it will continue to support the OS, with a promise to release 10.3.3. Therefore, BlackBerry 10 would not receive any major updates as BlackBerry and its partners would focus more on their Android base development.

Nintendo 3DS system software
The Nintendo 3DS system software is the updatable operating system used by the Nintendo 3DS.

Symbian

Symbian platform was developed by Nokia for some models of smartphones. It is proprietary software, it was however used by Ericsson (SonyEricsson), Sending and Benq. The operating system was discontinued in 2012, although a slimmed-down version for basic phones was still developed until July 2014. Microsoft officially shelved the platform in favor of Windows Phone after its acquisition of Nokia.

Palm OS

Palm OS/Garnet OS was from Access Co. It is closed-source and proprietary. webOS was introduced by Palm in January 2009, as the successor to Palm OS with Web 2.0 technologies, open architecture and multitasking abilities.

Microsoft

Windows Mobile

Windows Mobile is a family of proprietary operating systems from Microsoft aimed at business and enterprise users, based on Windows CE and originally developed for Pocket PC (PDA) devices. In 2010 it was replaced with the consumer-focused Windows Phone.

Versions of Windows Mobile came in multiple editions, like "Pocket PC Premium", "Pocket PC Professional", "Pocket PC Phone", and "Smartphone" (Windows Mobile 2003) or "Professional", "Standard", and "Classic" (Windows Mobile 6.0). Some editions were touchscreen-only and some were keyboard-only, although there were cases where device vendors managed to graft support for one onto an edition targeted at the other. Cellular phone features were also only supported by some editions. Microsoft started work on a version of Windows Mobile that would combine all features together, but it was aborted, and instead they focused on developing the non-backward-compatible, touchscreen-only Windows Phone 7.

Windows Phone

Windows Phone is a proprietary mobile operating system developed by Microsoft for smartphones as the replacement successor to Windows Mobile and Zune. Windows Phone features a new touchscreen-oriented user interface derived from Metro design language. Windows Phone was replaced by Windows 10 Mobile in 2015.

Windows 10 Mobile

Windows 10 Mobile (formerly called Windows Phone) is from Microsoft. It is closed-source and proprietary.

Unveiled on February 15, 2010, Windows Phone includes a user interface inspired by Microsoft's Metro Design Language. It is integrated with Microsoft services such as OneDrive and Office, Xbox Music, Xbox Video, Xbox Live games, and Bing, but also integrates with many other non-Microsoft services such as Facebook and Google accounts. Windows Phone devices were made primarily by Microsoft Mobile/Nokia, and also by HTC and Samsung.

On January 21, 2015, Microsoft announced that the Windows Phone brand will be phased out and replaced with Windows 10 Mobile, bringing tighter integration and unification with its PC counterpart Windows 10, and provide a platform for smartphones and tablets with screen sizes under 8 inches.

On October 8, 2017, Microsoft officially announced that they would no longer push any major updates to Windows 10 Mobile, instead it would put it in maintenance mode, where Microsoft would push bug fixes and general improvements only, therefore Windows 10 Mobile would not receive any new feature updates.

On January 18, 2019, Microsoft announced that support for Windows 10 Mobile would end on December 10, 2019, with no further security updates released after then, and that Windows 10 Mobile users should migrate to iOS or Android phones.

Current Windows 10 Mobile version list:

 Windows 10 Mobile – Version 1511 (November Update "Threshold") – major UI update
 Windows 10 Mobile – Version 1607 (Anniversary Update "Redstone 1")
 Windows 10 Mobile – Version 1703 (Creators Update "Redstone 2")
 Windows 10 Mobile – Version 1709 (Fall Creators Update)

Market share

Usage

In 2006, Android and iOS did not exist and only 64 million smartphones were sold. In 2018 Q1, 183.5 million smartphones were sold and global market share was 48.9% for Android and 19.1% for iOS. Other OS smartphones were 0,131 million, counting the 0.03% of the total.

According to StatCounter web use statistics (a proxy for all use), smartphones (alone without tablets) have majority use globally, with desktop computers used much less (and Android, in particular, more popular than Windows). Use varies however by continent with smartphones way more popular in the biggest continents, i.e. Asia, and the desktop still more popular in some, though not in North America.

The desktop is still popular in many countries (while overall down to 44.9% in the first quarter of 2017), smartphones are more popular even in many developed countries (or about to be in more). A few countries on any continent are desktop-minority; European countries (and some in South America, and a few, e.g. Haiti, in North America; and most in Asia and Africa) are smartphone-majority, Poland and Turkey highest with 57.68% and 62.33%, respectively. In Ireland, smartphone use at 45.55% outnumbers desktop use and mobile as a whole gains majority when including the tablet share at 9.12%. Spain is also slightly desktop-minority.

The range of measured mobile web use varies a lot by country, and a StatCounter press release recognizes "India amongst world leaders in use of mobile to surf the internet" (of the big countries) where the share is around (or over) 80% and desktop is at 19.56%, with Russia trailing with 17.8% mobile use (and desktop the rest).

Smartphones (alone, without tablets), first gained majority in December 2016 (desktop-majority was lost the month before), and it wasn't a Christmas-time fluke, as while close to majority after smartphone majority happened again in March 2017.

In the week from November 7–13, 2016, smartphones alone (without tablets) overtook desktop, for the first time (for a short period; non-full-month). Mobile-majority applies to countries such as Paraguay in South America, Poland in Europe and Turkey; and most of Asia and Africa. Some of the world is still desktop-majority, with e.g. in the United States at 54.89% (but no not on all days). However, in some territories of the United States, such as Puerto Rico, desktop is way under majority, with Windows under 30% overtaken by Android.

On October 22, 2016 (and subsequent weekends), mobile showed majority. Since October 27, the desktop hasn't shown majority, not even on weekdays. And smartphones alone have showed majority since December 23 to the end of the year, with the share topping at 58.22% on Christmas Day. To the "mobile"-majority share then of smartphones, tablets could be added giving a  63.22% majority. While an unusually high top, a similarly high also happened on Monday April 17, 2017, with then only smartphones share slightly lower and tablet share slightly higher, with them combined at 62.88%.

, the world has turned desktop-minority; at about 49% desktop use for the previous month, but mobile wasn't ranked higher, tablet share had to be added to it to exceed desktop share. By now, mobile (smartphones) have full majority, outnumbering desktop/laptop computers by a safe margin (and no longer counting tablets with desktops makes them most popular).

By operating system
Notes:
 Windows includes all versions.
 BlackBerry includes all versions.
 Other includes all other smartphone OSes but not feature phone OSes.

See also

References

External links
 Android
 Apple

 
Mobile phones
Operating systems
Software wars